

Thread of Time – The Best of the Music of Enya (2002) is the fifth album released by the Taliesin Orchestra, and is a tribute to the Irish singer Enya.  There have been three other Enya tribute albums released by the Orchestra: Orinoco Flow, An Instrumental Tribute to the Hits of Enya, and Maiden of Mysteries.

Track listing 
"Council of Elrond with Aniron" – 5:36
"Orinoco Flow" – 4:12
"May It Be" – 4:37
"Only If" – 6:10
"Before the Storm" – 2:48
"Storms in Africa" – 7:06
"Memory of Trees" – 4:23
"Anywhere Is" – 5:48
"Athair Ar Neamh" – 3:40
"Evacuee" – 3:53
"Only Time" – 4:18

Personnel
Rita Manning – violin
Jim McLeod – violin
Peter Oxer – violin
Anthony Pleeth – cello
Maciej Rakowski – violin
Frank Ricotti – timpani
David Shumway – cello
Robert Spates – violin
Hugh Webb – harp
Gavyn Wright – violin
Felicia Sorensen – arranger, vocal arrangement 
Bill Benham – violin
Barbara Brown – cello
Dermot Crehan – violin
Vaughan Armon – violin
Martin Robinson – cello
Patrick Kiernan – violin
Boguslaw Kostecki – violin
Justin Pearson – cello
Mark Whitaker – art direction, design 
Rolf Wilson – violin
Cathy Giles – cello
Sam Skelton – woodwind
Kathy Birch – cello
Lee Brewster – violin
Riza Browder – violin
Bill Comita – cello
Paul Gardham – French horn
Jeff Girdler – French horn
James Gollmer – French horn
Jennifer Himes – violin
Harriette Hurd – violin
Linda Kapusciars – cello
Phyllis Mauney – harp
Sue Midkiff – violin
Jon Nazdin – bass
John Pigneguy – French horn
Simon Rundlett – violin
Nancy Jo Snider – cello
Phil Splezter – violin
Judy Steinmeyer – violin
Richard Watkins – French horn
Lisa Sayre – oboe
Roger Whitworth – French horn
Paul Cullington – double bass
Amy Comtrolis – cello
Perry Mason – violin
Rebecca Hirsch – violin
Kenneth Soper – French horn
Belinda Swanson – violin
Hugh Seenan – French horn
Sophie Harris – cello
Teri Lazar – violin
Bruno Nasta – violin
Charles Sayre – conductor 
Leslie Ludena – orchestra 
Carlton Batts – mastering 
Mark Berrow – violin
Ben Cruft – violin
Roger Garland – violin
Wilfred Gibson – violin
John Heley – cello
Paul Kegg – cello
Gary Kettel – percussion
Chris Laurence – double bass 
Martin Loveday – cello
Trammell Starks – keyboards, programming, mixing, producer, engineer

See also
Taliesin Orchestra
Orinoco Flow - The Music of Enya

External links
Musical Discoveries review

2002 albums
Taliesin Orchestra albums
Enya tribute albums